The 1983–84 daytime network television schedule for the three major English-language commercial broadcast networks in the United States covers the weekday and weekend daytime hours from September 1983 to August 1984.

Legend

 New series are highlighted in bold.

Schedule
 All times correspond to U.S. Eastern and Pacific Time scheduling (except for some live sports or events). Except where affiliates slot certain programs outside their network-dictated timeslots, subtract one hour for Central, Mountain, Alaska, and Hawaii-Aleutian times.
 Local schedules may differ, as affiliates have the option to pre-empt or delay network programs. Such scheduling may be limited to preemptions caused by local or national breaking news or weather coverage (which may force stations to tape delay certain programs to other timeslots) and any major sports events scheduled to air in a weekday timeslot (mainly during major holidays). Stations may air shows at other times at their preference.

Monday–Friday

Notes:
 During the two weeks that the 1984 Summer Olympics was broadcast on ABC, all regular programming was pre-empted except for 40-minute versions of All My Children, One Life to Live, and General Hospital, which ran from July 30 through August 3 from 2 pm ET/11 am PT to 4 pm ET/1 pm PT and August 6 through August 10 from 1 pm ET/10 am PT to 3 pm ET/12 noon PT.
 The New Newlywed Game aired on ABC from February 13 to 17, 1984 at 11:00AM EST. Hosted by Jim Lange, it was a test week of shows to see if a daytime version of Newlywed Game might be feasible for ABC. The series did re-emerge eighteen months later in syndication with Bob Eubanks hosting again; he couldn't host the February 1984 week of shows because he was hosting Dream House on NBC at the time.

Saturday

In the News aired at the end of most of CBS' Saturday morning shows.

One to Grow On aired after the credits of NBC's Saturday morning shows except The Flintstone Funnies, Mister T, and Thundarr the Barbarian.

Sunday

By network

ABC

Returning series
ABC Weekend Special
ABC World News This Morning
ABC World News Tonight
All My Children
American Bandstand
The Best of Scooby-Doo
Celebrity Family Feud
The Edge of Night
Family Feud
General Hospital
Good Morning America
Loving
One Life to Live
Pac-Man 
The Puppy's Further Adventures
Ryan's Hope
Schoolhouse Rock!
This Week with David Brinkley

New series
Benson 
The Littles
The Love Report
Menudo on ABC
The Monchhichis/Little Rascals/Richie Rich Show
The New Scooby and Scrappy-Doo Show
Rubik, the Amazing Cube

Canceled/Ended
The Love Boat 
The Mork & Mindy/Laverne & Shirley/Fonz Hour
The Pac-Man/Little Rascals/Richie Rich Show
The Scooby & Scrappy-Doo/Puppy Hour
Super Friends
Too Close For Comfort

CBS

Returning series
The $25,000 Pyramid
As the World Turns
The Bugs Bunny/Road Runner Show
Capitol
Captain Kangaroo
CBS Children's Film Festival
CBS Evening News
CBS Morning News
CBS News Sunday Morning
The Dukes
Face the Nation
Guiding Light
Gilligan's Planet 
Meatballs and Spaghetti 
The New Fat Albert Show
Plastic Man 
The Price Is Right
Tarzan, Lord of the Jungle 
Tattletales
The Young and the Restless

New series
Benji, Zax & the Alien Prince
The Biskitts
Body Language
The Charlie Brown and Snoopy Show
Dungeons & Dragons
Press Your Luck
Saturday Supercade

Canceled/Ended
Blackstar 
Child's Play
The Kwicky Koala Show
The New $25,000 Pyramid
Pandamonium
The Popeye and Olive Comedy Show
Speed Buggy 
Sunrise Semester
Sylvester & Tweety, Daffy, and Speedy Show

NBC

Returning series
Another World
Days of Our Lives
Diff'rent Strokes 
Dream House
The Facts of Life 
The Flintstone Funnies
The Incredible Hulk
Meet the Press
NBC News at Sunrise
NBC Nightly News
Sale of the Century
Search for Tomorrow
Shirt Tales
The Smurfs
Spider-Man and His Amazing Friends
Thundarr the Barbarian 
Today
Wheel of Fortune

New series
Alvin and the Chipmunks
GO
Hot Potato
Match Game-Hollywood Squares Hour
Mister T
Santa Barbara
Scrabble

Canceled/Ended
The Doctors
Fantasy
The Gary Coleman Show
Hit Man
The Jetsons 
Just Men!
The New Adventures of Flash Gordon
The New Battlestars
Texas

See also
1983-84 United States network television schedule (prime-time)
1983-84 United States network television schedule (late night)

Sources
https://web.archive.org/web/20071015122215/http://curtalliaume.com/abc_day.html
https://web.archive.org/web/20071015122235/http://curtalliaume.com/cbs_day.html
https://web.archive.org/web/20071012211242/http://curtalliaume.com/nbc_day.html

United States weekday network television schedules
1983 in American television
1984 in American television